Individualist anarchism is the branch of anarchism that emphasizes the individual and their will over external determinants such as groups, society, traditions and ideological systems. Although usually contrasted to social anarchism, both individualist and social anarchism have influenced each other. Some anarcho-capitalists claim anarcho-capitalism is part of the individualist anarchist tradition while others disagree and claim individualist anarchism is only part of the socialist movement and part of the libertarian socialist tradition. Mutualism, an economic theory sometimes considered a synthesis of communism and property, has been considered individualist anarchism and other times part of social anarchism. Many anarcho-communists regard themselves as radical individualists, seeing anarcho-communism as the best social system for the realization of individual freedom. Economically, while European individualist anarchists are pluralists who advocate anarchism without adjectives and synthesis anarchism, ranging from anarcho-communist to mutualist economic types, most American individualist anarchists of the 19th century advocated mutualism, a libertarian socialist form of market socialism, or a free-market socialist form of classical economics. Individualist anarchists are opposed to property that violates the entitlement theory of justice, that is, gives privilege due to unjust acquisition or exchange, and thus is exploitative, seeking to "destroy the tyranny of capital, — that is, of property" by mutual credit.

Individualist anarchism represents a group of several traditions of thought and individualist philosophies within the anarchist movement. Among the early influences on individualist anarchism were William Godwin (philosophical anarchism), Josiah Warren (sovereignty of the individual), Max Stirner (egoism), Lysander Spooner (natural law), Pierre-Joseph Proudhon (mutualism), Henry David Thoreau (transcendentalism), Herbert Spencer (law of equal liberty) and Anselme Bellegarrigue (civil disobedience). From there, individualist anarchism expanded through Europe and the United States, where prominent 19th-century individualist anarchist Benjamin Tucker held that "if the individual has the right to govern himself, all external government is tyranny".

Within anarchism, individualist anarchism is primarily a literary phenomenon while social anarchism has been the dominant form of anarchism, emerging in the late 19th century as a distinction from individualist anarchism after anarcho-communism replaced collectivist anarchism as the dominant tendency. Individualist anarchism has been described by some as the anarchist branch most influenced by and tied to liberalism (the classical liberalism deriving anti-capitalist notions and socialist economics from classical political economists and the labor theory of value) as well as being described as a part of the liberal or liberal-socialist wing—in contrast to the collectivist or communist wing—of anarchism and libertarian socialism. However most do not agree with this divide as social anarchists including collectivist and communist anarchists regard the individualist anarchists as socialists and libertarian socialists due to their opposition to capitalist profit, interest, and absentee rent. The very idea of an individualist–socialist divide is also contested as individualist anarchism is largely socialistic and can be considered a form of individualist socialism, with non-Lockean individualism encompassing socialism. Individualist anarchism is the basis of most anarchist schools of thought, influencing nearly all anarchist tendencies and having contributed to much of anarchist discourse.

Overview 

The term individualist anarchism is often used as a classificatory term, but in very different ways. Some such as the authors of An Anarchist FAQ use the classification individualist anarchism/social anarchism. Others such as Geoffrey Ostergaard, who see individualist anarchism as distinctly non-socialist, recognizing anarcho-capitalist as part of the individualist anarchist tradition, use the classification individualist anarchism/socialist anarchism accordingly. However most do not consider anarcho-capitalism as part of the anarchist movement because anarchism has historically been an anti-capitalist movement and anarchists reject that it is compatible with capitalism. In addition, an analysis of individualist anarchists who advocated free-market anarchism shows that it is different from anarcho-capitalism and other capitalist theories due to the individualist anarchists retaining the labor theory of value and socialist doctrines. Other classifications include communal/mutualist anarchism. Michael Freeden identifies four broad types of individualist anarchism. Freeden says the first is the type associated with William Godwin that advocates self-government with a "progressive rationalism that included benevolence to others". The second type is the amoral self-serving rationality of egoism as most associated with Max Stirner. The third type is "found in Herbert Spencer's early predictions, and in that of some of his disciples such as Wordsworth Donisthorpe, foreseeing the redundancy of the state in the source of social evolution". The fourth type retains a moderated form of egoism and accounts for social cooperation through the advocacy of market relationships. Individualist anarchism of different kinds have the following things in common:
 The concentration on the individual and their will in preference to any construction such as morality, ideology, social custom, religion, metaphysics, ideas or the will of others.
 The rejection of or reservations about the idea of revolution, seeing it as a time of mass uprising which could bring about new hierarchies. Instead, they favor more evolutionary methods of bringing about anarchy through alternative experiences and experiments and education which could be brought about today. This is also because it is not seen as desirable for individuals to wait for revolution to start experiencing alternative experiences outside what is offered in the current social system.
 Individual experience and exploration is emphasized. The view that relationships with other persons or things can be in one's own interest only and can be as transitory and without compromises as desired since in individualist anarchism sacrifice is usually rejected. In this way, Max Stirner recommended associations of egoists.

Individualists anarchists considered themselves to be socialists and part of the socialist movement which according to those anarchists was divided in two wings, namely anarchist socialism and state socialism. Benjamin Tucker criticized those who were trying to exclude individualist anarchism from socialism based on dictionary's definitions. Tucker held that the mutualist title to land and other scarce resources would involve a radical change and restriction of capitalist property rights. It should also be noted social anarchists including collectivist and communist anarchists regard the individualist anarchists as socialists due to their opposition to surplus-value something even Karl Marx (whom Tucker was influenced by ) would agree is anti-capitalist.

Individualist anarchists such as Tucker argued that it was "not Socialist Anarchism against Individualist Anarchism, but of Communist Socialism against Individualist Socialism". Tucker further noted that "the fact that State Socialism has overshadowed other forms of Socialism gives it no right to a monopoly of the Socialistic idea". In 1888, Tucker, who proclaimed himself to be an anarchistic socialist in opposition to state socialism, included the full text of a "Socialistic Letter" by Ernest Lesigne in his essay "State Socialism and Anarchism". According to Lesigne, there are two socialisms: "One is dictatorial, the other libertarian". Tucker's two socialisms were the state socialism which he associated to the Marxist school and the libertarian socialism that he advocated. What those two schools of socialism had in common was the labor theory of value and the ends, by which anarchism pursued different means.

According to Rudolf Rocker, individualist anarchists "all agree on the point that man be given the full reward of his labour and recognised in this right the economic basis of all personal liberty. They regard free competition [...] as something inherent in human nature. [...] They answered the socialists of other schools who saw in free competition one of the destructive elements of capitalistic society that the evil lies in the fact that today we have too little rather than too much competition". Individualist anarchist Joseph Labadie wrote that both "the two great sub-divisions of Socialists [Anarchists and State Socialists] agree that the resources of nature — land, mines, and so forth — should not be held as private property and subject to being held by the individual for speculative purposes, that use of these things shall be the only valid title, and that each person has an equal right to the use of all these things. They all agree that the present social system is one composed of a class of slaves and a class of masters, and that justice is impossible under such conditions". The egoist form of individualist anarchism, derived from the philosophy of Max Stirner, supports the individual doing exactly what he pleases—taking no notice of God, state, or moral rules. To Stirner, rights were spooks in the mind, and he held that society does not exist but "the individuals are its reality"—he supported property by force of might rather than moral right. Stirner advocated self-assertion and foresaw "associations of egoists" drawn together by respect for each other's ruthlessness.

For historian Eunice Minette Schuster, American individualist anarchism "stresses the isolation of the individual  –  his right to his own tools, his mind, his body, and to the products of his labor. To the artist who embraces this philosophy it is "aesthetic" anarchism, to the reformer, ethical anarchism, to the independent mechanic, economic anarchism. The former is concerned with philosophy, the latter with practical demonstration. The economic anarchist is concerned with constructing a society on the basis of anarchism. Economically he sees no harm whatever in the private possession of what the individual produces by his own labor, but only so much and no more. The aesthetic and ethical type found expression in the transcendentalism, humanitarianism, and Romanticism of the first part of the nineteenth century, the economic type in the pioneer life of the West during the same period, but more favorably after the Civil War".

For this reason, it has been suggested that in order to understand individualist anarchism one must take into account "the social context of their ideas, namely the transformation of America from a pre-capitalist to a capitalist society [...] the non-capitalist nature of the early U.S. can be seen from the early dominance of self-employment (artisan and peasant production). At the beginning of the 19th century, around 80% of the working (non-slave) male population were self-employed. The great majority of Americans during this time were farmers working their own land, primarily for their own needs" and "[i]ndividualist anarchism is clearly a form of artisanal socialism [...] while communist anarchism and anarcho-syndicalism are forms of industrial (or proletarian) socialism".

Liberty insisted on "the abolition of the State and the abolition of usury; on no more government of man by man, and no more exploitation of man by man" and anarchism is "the abolition of the State and the abolition of usury". Those anarchists held that there were "two schools of Socialistic thought, [...] State Socialism and Anarchism" and "liberty insists on Socialism [...] — true Socialism, Anarchistic Socialism: the prevalence on earth of Liberty, Equality, and Solidarity". Individualist anarchists followed Proudhon and other anarchists that "exploitation of man by man and the domination of man over man are inseparable, and each is the condition of the other", that "the bottom claim of Socialism" was "that labour should be put in possession of its own", that "the natural wage of labour is its product" in an "effort to abolish the exploitation of labour by capital" and that anarchists "do not admit the government of man by man any more than the exploitation of man by man", advocating "the complete destruction of the domination and exploitation of man by man". Contemporary individualist anarchist Kevin Carson characterizes American individualist anarchism by saying that "[u]nlike the rest of the socialist movement, the individualist anarchists believed that the natural wage of labor in a free market was its product, and that economic exploitation could only take place when capitalists and landlords harnessed the power of the state in their interests. Thus, individualist anarchism was an alternative both to the increasing statism of the mainstream socialist movement, and to a classical liberal movement that was moving toward a mere apologetic for the power of big business".

In European individualist anarchism, a different social context helped the rise of European individualist illegalism and as such "[t]he illegalists were proletarians who had nothing to sell but their labour power, and nothing to discard but their dignity; if they disdained waged-work, it was because of its compulsive nature. If they turned to illegality it was due to the fact that honest toil only benefited the employers and often entailed a complete loss of dignity, while any complaints resulted in the sack; to avoid starvation through lack of work it was necessary to beg or steal, and to avoid conscription into the army many of them had to go on the run". A European tendency of individualist anarchism advocated violent individual acts of individual reclamation, propaganda by the deed and criticism of organization. Such individualist anarchist tendencies include French illegalism and Italian anti-organizational insurrectionarism. Bookchin reports that at the end of the 19th century and the beginning of the 20th "it was in times of severe social repression and deadening social quiescence that individualist anarchists came to the foreground of libertarian activity – and then primarily as terrorists. In France, Spain, and the United States, individualistic anarchists committed acts of terrorism that gave anarchism its reputation as a violently sinister conspiracy".

Another important tendency within individualist anarchist currents emphasizes individual subjective exploration and defiance of social conventions. Individualist anarchist philosophy attracted "amongst artists, intellectuals and the well-read, urban middle classes in general". Murray Bookchin describes a lot of individualist anarchism as people who "expressed their opposition in uniquely personal forms, especially in fiery tracts, outrageous behavior and aberrant lifestyles in the cultural ghettos of fin de siecle New York, Paris and London. As a credo, individualist anarchism remained largely a bohemian lifestyle, most conspicuous in its demands for sexual freedom ('free love') and enamored of innovations in art, behavior, and clothing". In this way, free love currents and other radical lifestyles such as naturism had popularity among individualist anarchists.

For Catalan historian Xavier Diez, "under its iconoclastic, antiintelectual, antitheist run, which goes against all sacralized ideas or values it entailed, a philosophy of life which could be considered a reaction against the sacred gods of capitalist society. Against the idea of nation, it opposed its internationalism. Against the exaltation of authority embodied in the military institution, it opposed its antimilitarism. Against the concept of industrial civilization, it opposed its naturist vision". In regards to economic questions, there are diverse positions. There are adherents to mutualism (Proudhon, Émile Armand and the early Tucker), egoistic disrespect for "ghosts" such as private property and markets (Stirner, John Henry Mackay, Lev Chernyi and the later Tucker) and adherents to anarcho-communism (Albert Libertad, illegalism and Renzo Novatore). Anarchist historian George Woodcock finds a tendency in individualist anarchism of a "distrust (of) all co-operation beyond the barest minimum for an ascetic life". On the issue of violence opinions have gone from a violentist point of view mainly exemplified by illegalism and insurrectionary anarchism to one that can be called anarcho-pacifist. In the particular case of Spanish individualist anarchist Miguel Giménez Igualada, he went from illegalist practice in his youth towards a pacifist position later in his life.

Early influences

William Godwin 

William Godwin can be considered an individualist anarchist and philosophical anarchist who was influenced by the ideas of the Age of Enlightenment, and developed what many consider the first expression of modern anarchist thought. According to Peter Kropotkin, Godwin was "the first to formulate the political and economical conceptions of anarchism, even though he did not give that name to the ideas developed in his work".<ref name="EB1910">Peter Kropotkin, "Anarchism", Encyclopædia Britannica, 1910</ref> Godwin himself attributed the first anarchist writing to Edmund Burke's A Vindication of Natural Society. Godwin advocated extreme individualism, proposing that all cooperation in labor be eliminated. Godwin was a utilitarian who believed that all individuals are not of equal value, with some of us "of more worth and importance" than others depending on our utility in bringing about social good. Therefore, he does not believe in equal rights, but the person's life that should be favored that is most conducive to the general good. Godwin opposed government because it infringes on the individual's right to "private judgement" to determine which actions most maximize utility, but also makes a critique of all authority over the individual's judgement. This aspect of Godwin's philosophy, minus the utilitarianism, was developed into a more extreme form later by Stirner.

Godwin took individualism to the radical extent of opposing individuals performing together in orchestras, writing in Political Justice that "everything understood by the term co-operation is in some sense an evil". The only apparent exception to this opposition to cooperation is the spontaneous association that may arise when a society is threatened by violent force. One reason he opposed cooperation is he believed it to interfere with an individual's ability to be benevolent for the greater good. Godwin opposes the idea of government, but wrote that a minimal state as a present "necessary evil" that would become increasingly irrelevant and powerless by the gradual spread of knowledge. He believed democracy to be preferable to other forms of government.

Godwin supported individual ownership of property, defining it as "the empire to which every man is entitled over the produce of his own industry". However, he also advocated that individuals give to each other their surplus property on the occasion that others have a need for it, without involving trade (e.g. gift economy). Thus while people have the right to private property, they should give it away as enlightened altruists. This was to be based on utilitarian principles and he said: "Every man has a right to that, the exclusive possession of which being awarded to him, a greater sum of benefit or pleasure will result than could have arisen from its being otherwise appropriated".

Godwin's political views were diverse and do not perfectly agree with any of the ideologies that claim his influence as writers of the Socialist Standard, organ of the Socialist Party of Great Britain, consider Godwin both an individualist and a communist; Murray Rothbard did not regard Godwin as being in the individualist camp at all, referring to him as the "founder of communist anarchism"; and historian Albert Weisbord considers him an individualist anarchist without reservation. Some writers see a conflict between Godwin's advocacy of "private judgement" and utilitarianism as he says that ethics requires that individuals give their surplus property to each other resulting in an egalitarian society, but at the same time he insists that all things be left to individual choice. As noted by Kropotkin, many of Godwin's views changed over time.

William Godwin's influenced "the socialism of Robert Owen and Charles Fourier. After success of his British venture, Owen himself established a cooperative community within the United States at New Harmony, Indiana during 1825. One member of this commune was Josiah Warren, considered to be the first individualist anarchist. After New Harmony failed, Warren shifted his ideological loyalties from socialism to anarchism. According to anarchist Peter Sabatini, this "was no great leap, given that Owen's socialism had been predicated on Godwin's anarchism".

 Pierre-Joseph Proudhon 

Pierre-Joseph Proudhon was the first philosopher to label himself an "anarchist". Some consider Proudhon to be an individualist anarchist while others regard him to be a social anarchist.Knowles, Rob. "Political Economy from below : Communitarian Anarchism as a Neglected Discourse in Histories of Economic Thought". History of Economics Review, No.31 Winter 2000. Some commentators do not identify Proudhon as an individualist anarchist due to his preference for association in large industries, rather than individual control. Nevertheless, he was influential among some of the American individualists—in the 1840s and 1850s, Charles Anderson Dana and William Batchelder Greene introduced Proudhon's works to the United States. Greene adapted Proudhon's mutualism to American conditions and introduced it to Benjamin Tucker.

Proudhon opposed government privilege that protects capitalist, banking and land interests and the accumulation or acquisition of property (and any form of coercion that led to it) which he believed hampers competition and keeps wealth in the hands of the few. Proudhon favoured a right of individuals to retain the product of their labour as their own property, but he believed that any property beyond that which an individual produced and could possess was illegitimate. Thus he saw private property as both essential to liberty and a road to tyranny, the former when it resulted from labour and was required for labour and the latter when it resulted in exploitation (profit, interest, rent and tax). He generally called the former "possession" and the latter "property". For large-scale industry, he supported workers associations to replace wage labour and opposed the ownership of land.

Proudhon maintained that those who labour should retain the entirety of what they produce and that monopolies on credit and land are the forces that prohibit such. He advocated an economic system that included private property as possession and exchange market, but without profit, which he called mutualism. It is Proudhon's philosophy that was explicitly rejected by Joseph Déjacque in the inception of anarcho-communism, with the latter asserting directly to Proudhon in a letter that "it is not the product of his or her labour that the worker has a right to, but to the satisfaction of his or her needs, whatever may be their nature". An individualist rather than anarcho-communist, Proudhon said that "communism [...] is the very denial of society in its foundation" and famously declared that "property is theft" in reference to his rejection of ownership rights to land being granted to a person who is not using that land.

After Déjacque and others split from Proudhon due to the latter's support of individual property and an exchange economy, the relationship between the individualists (who continued in relative alignment with the philosophy of Proudhon) and the anarcho-communists was characterised by various degrees of antagonism and harmony. For example, individualists like Tucker on the one hand translated and reprinted the works of collectivists like Mikhail Bakunin while on the other hand rejected the economic aspects of collectivism and communism as incompatible with anarchist ideals.

 Max Stirner 

Johann Kaspar Schmidt, better known as Max Stirner (the nom de plume he adopted from a schoolyard nickname he had acquired as a child because of his high brow, in German Stirn), was a German philosopher who ranks as one of the literary fathers of nihilism, existentialism, post-modernism and anarchism, especially of individualist anarchism. Stirner's main work is The Ego and Its Own, also known as The Ego and His Own (Der Einzige und sein Eigentum in German which translates literally as The Only One [individual] and his Property or The Unique Individual and His Property). This work was first published in 1844 in Leipzig and has since appeared in numerous editions and translations.

 Egoism 

Max Stirner's philosophy, sometimes called egoism, is a form of individualist anarchism. Stirner was a Hegelian philosopher whose "name appears with familiar regularity in historically oriented surveys of anarchist thought as one of the earliest and best-known exponents of individualist anarchism". In 1844, Stirner's work The Ego and Its Own was published and is considered to be "a founding text in the tradition of individualist anarchism". Stirner does not recommend that the individual try to eliminate the state, but simply that they disregard the state when it conflicts with one's autonomous choices and go along with it when doing so is conducive to one's interests. Stirner says that the egoist rejects pursuit of devotion to "a great idea, a good cause, a doctrine, a system, a lofty calling", arguing that the egoist has no political calling, but rather "lives themselves out" without regard to "how well or ill humanity may fare thereby". Stirner held that the only limitation on the rights of the individual is that individual's power to obtain what he desires. Stirner proposes that most commonly accepted social institutions, including the notion of state, property as a right, natural rights in general and the very notion of "society" as a legal and ideal abstractness, were mere spooks in the mind. Stirner wants to "abolish not only the state but also society as an institution responsible for its members". Stirner advocated self-assertion and foresaw Union of egoists, non-systematic associations which he proposed in as a form of organization in place of the state. A Union is understood as a relation between egoists which is continually renewed by all parties' support through an act of will. Even murder is permissible "if it is right for me", although it is claimed by egoist anarchists that egoism will foster genuine and spontaneous unions between individuals.

For Stirner, property simply comes about through might, arguing that "[w]hoever knows how to take, to defend, the thing, to him belongs property". He further says that "[w]hat I have in my power, that is my own. So long as I assert myself as holder, I am the proprietor of the thing" and that "I do not step shyly back from your property, but look upon it always as my property, in which I respect nothing. Pray do the like with what you call my property!" His concept of "egoistic property" not only a lack of moral restraint on how one obtains and uses things, but includes other people as well. His embrace of egotism is in stark contrast to Godwin's altruism. Although Stirner was opposed to communism, for the same reasons he opposed capitalism, humanism, liberalism, property rights and nationalism, seeing them as forms of authority over the individual and as spooks in the mind, he has influenced many anarcho-communists and post-left anarchists. The writers of An Anarchist FAQ report that "many in the anarchist movement in Glasgow, Scotland, took Stirner's 'Union of egoists' literally as the basis for their anarcho-syndicalist organising in the 1940s and beyond". Similarly, the noted anarchist historian Max Nettlau states that "[o]n reading Stirner, I maintain that he cannot be interpreted except in a socialist sense". Stirner does not personally oppose the struggles carried out by certain ideologies such as socialism, humanism or the advocacy of human rights. Rather, he opposes their legal and ideal abstractness, a fact that makes him different from the liberal individualists, including the anarcho-capitalists and right-libertarians, but also from the Übermensch theories of fascism as he places the individual at the center and not the sacred collective. About socialism, Stirner wrote in a letter to Moses Hess that "I am not at all against socialism, but against consecrated socialism; my selfishness is not opposed to love [...] nor is it an enemy of sacrifice, nor of self-denial [...] and least of all of socialism [...] — in short, it is not an enemy of true interests; it rebels not against love, but against sacred love, not against thought, but against sacred thought, not against socialists, but against sacred socialism".

This position on property is quite different from the Native American, natural law, form of individualist anarchism which defends the inviolability of the private property that has been earned through labor. However, Benjamin Tucker rejected the natural rights philosophy and adopted Stirner's egoism in 1886, with several others joining with him. This split the American individualists into fierce debate, "with the natural rights proponents accusing the egoists of destroying libertarianism itself". Other egoists include James L. Walker, Sidney Parker, Dora Marsden and John Beverly Robinson. In Russia, individualist anarchism inspired by Stirner combined with an appreciation for Friedrich Nietzsche attracted a small following of bohemian artists and intellectuals such as Lev Chernyi as well as a few lone wolves who found self-expression in crime and violence. They rejected organizing, believing that only unorganized individuals were safe from coercion and domination, believing this kept them true to the ideals of anarchism. This type of individualist anarchism inspired anarcha-feminist Emma Goldman.

Although Stirner's philosophy is individualist, it has influenced some libertarian communists and anarcho-communists. "For Ourselves Council for Generalized Self-Management" discusses Stirner and speaks of a "communist egoism" which is said to be a "synthesis of individualism and collectivism" and says that "greed in its fullest sense is the only possible basis of communist society". Forms of libertarian communism such as Situationism are influenced by Stirner. Anarcho-communist Emma Goldman was influenced by both Stirner and Peter Kropotkin and blended their philosophies together in her own as shown in books of hers such as Anarchism And Other Essays.

 Early individualist anarchism in the United States 
 Josiah Warren 

Josiah Warren is widely regarded as the first American anarchist and the four-page weekly paper he edited during 1833, The Peaceful Revolutionist, was the first anarchist periodical published, an enterprise for which he built his own printing press, cast his own type and made his own printing plates. Warren was a follower of Robert Owen and joined Owen's community at New Harmony, Indiana. Warren termed the phrase "Cost the limit of price", with "cost" here referring not to monetary price paid but the labor one exerted to produce an item. Therefore, "[h]e proposed a system to pay people with certificates indicating how many hours of work they did. They could exchange the notes at local time stores for goods that took the same amount of time to produce". He put his theories to the test by establishing an experimental "labor for labor store" called the Cincinnati Time Store where trade was facilitated by notes backed by a promise to perform labor. The store proved successful and operated for three years after which it was closed so that Warren could pursue establishing colonies based on mutualism. These included Utopia and Modern Times. Warren said that Stephen Pearl Andrews' The Science of Society (published in 1852) was the most lucid and complete exposition of Warren's own theories. Catalan historian Xavier Diez report that the intentional communal experiments pioneered by Warren were influential in European individualist anarchists of the late 19th and early 20th centuries such as Émile Armand and the intentional communities started by them.

 Henry David Thoreau 

Henry David Thoreau was an important early influence in individualist anarchist thought in the United States and Europe. Thoreau was an American author, poet, naturalist, tax resister, development critic, surveyor, historian, philosopher and leading transcendentalist. He is best known for his book Walden, a reflection upon simple living in natural surroundings; and his essay, Civil Disobedience, an argument for individual resistance to civil government in moral opposition to an unjust state. His thought is an early influence on green anarchism, but with an emphasis on the individual experience of the natural world influencing later naturist currents, simple living as a rejection of a materialist lifestyle and self-sufficiency were Thoreau's goals and the whole project was inspired by transcendentalist philosophy. Many have seen in Thoreau one of the precursors of ecologism and anarcho-primitivism represented today in John Zerzan. For George Woodcock, this attitude can be also motivated by certain idea of resistance to progress and of rejection of the growing materialism which is the nature of American society in the mid 19th century.

The essay "Civil Disobedience" (Resistance to Civil Government) was first published in 1849. It argues that people should not permit governments to overrule or atrophy their consciences and that people have a duty to avoid allowing such acquiescence to enable the government to make them the agents of injustice. Thoreau was motivated in part by his disgust with slavery and the Mexican–American War. The essay later influenced Mohandas Gandhi, Martin Luther King Jr., Martin Buber and Leo Tolstoy through its advocacy of nonviolent resistance. It is also the main precedent for anarcho-pacifism. The American version of individualist anarchism has a strong emphasis on the non-aggression principle and individual sovereignty. Some individualist anarchists such as ThoreauEncyclopaedia of the Social Sciences, edited by Edwin Robert Anderson Seligman, Alvin Saunders Johnson, 1937, p. 12. do not speak of economics, but simply of the right of "disunion" from the state and foresee the gradual elimination of the state through social evolution.

 Developments and expansion 
 Anarcha-feminism, free love, freethought and LGBT issues 

An important current within individualist anarchism is free love. Free love advocates sometimes traced their roots back to Josiah Warren and to experimental communities, and viewed sexual freedom as a clear, direct expression of an individual's self-ownership. Free love particularly stressed women's rights since most sexual laws, such as those governing marriage and use of birth control, discriminated against women. The most important American free love journal was Lucifer the Lightbearer (1883–1907) edited by Moses Harman and Lois Waisbrooker but also there existed Ezra Heywood and Angela Heywood's The Word (1872–1890, 1892–1893). M. E. Lazarus was also an important American individualist anarchist who promoted free love. John William Lloyd, a collaborator of Benjamin Tucker's periodical Liberty, published in 1931 a sex manual that he called The Karezza Method or Magnetation: The Art of Connubial Love.

In Europe, the main propagandist of free love within individualist anarchism was Émile Armand. He proposed the concept of la camaraderie amoureuse to speak of free love as the possibility of voluntary sexual encounter between consenting adults. He was also a consistent proponent of polyamory. In France, there was also feminist activity inside individualist anarchism as promoted by individualist feminists Marie Küge, Anna Mahé, Rirette Maîtrejean and Sophia Zaïkovska.

The Brazilian individualist anarchist Maria Lacerda de Moura lectured on topics such as education, women's rights, free love and antimilitarism. Her writings and essays garnered her attention not only in Brazil, but also in Argentina and Uruguay. She also wrote for the Spanish individualist anarchist magazine Al Margen alongside Miguel Giménez Igualada. In Germany, the Stirnerists Adolf Brand and John Henry Mackay were pioneering campaigners for the acceptance of male bisexuality and homosexuality.

Freethought as a philosophical position and as activism was important in both North American and European individualist anarchism, but in the United States freethought was basically an anti-Christian, anti-clerical movement whose purpose was to make the individual politically and spiritually free to decide for himself on religious matters. A number of contributors to Liberty were prominent figures in both freethought and anarchism. The individualist anarchist George MacDonald was a co-editor of Freethought and for a time The Truth Seeker. E.C. Walker was co-editor of Lucifer, the Light-Bearer. Many of the anarchists were ardent freethinkers; reprints from freethought papers such as Lucifer, the Light-Bearer, Freethought and The Truth Seeker appeared in Liberty. The church was viewed as a common ally of the state and as a repressive force in and of itself.

In Europe, a similar development occurred in French and Spanish individualist anarchist circles: "Anticlericalism, just as in the rest of the libertarian movement, is another of the frequent elements which will gain relevance related to the measure in which the (French) Republic begins to have conflicts with the church [...] Anti-clerical discourse, frequently called for by the french individualist André Lorulot, will have its impacts in Estudios (a Spanish individualist anarchist publication). There will be an attack on institutionalized religion for the responsibility that it had in the past on negative developments, for its irrationality which makes it a counterpoint of philosophical and scientific progress. There will be a criticism of proselitism and ideological manipulation which happens on both believers and agnostics". This tendencies will continue in French individualist anarchism in the work and activism of Charles-Auguste Bontemps and others. In the Spanish individualist anarchist magazine Ética and Iniciales, "there is a strong interest in publishing scientific news, usually linked to a certain atheist and anti-theist obsession, philosophy which will also work for pointing out the incompatibility between science and religion, faith and reason. In this way there will be a lot of talk on Darwin's theories or on the negation of the existence of the soul".

 Anarcho-naturism 

Another important current, especially within French and Spanish"Anarchism and the different Naturist views have always been related." "Anarchism – Nudism, Naturism" by Carlos Ortega at Asociacion para el Desarrollo Naturista de la Comunidad de Madrid. Published on Revista ADN. Winter 2003. individualist anarchist groups was naturism. Naturism promoted an ecological worldview, small ecovillages and most prominently nudism as a way to avoid the artificiality of the industrial mass society of modernity. Naturist individualist anarchists saw the individual in his biological, physical and psychological aspects and avoided and tried to eliminate social determinations. An early influence in this vein was Henry David Thoreau and his famous book Walden. Important promoters of this were Henri Zisly and Émile Gravelle who collaborated in La Nouvelle Humanité followed by Le Naturien, Le Sauvage, L'Ordre Naturel and La Vie Naturelle."Henri Zisly, self-labeled individualist anarchist, is considered one of the forerunners and principal organizers of the naturist movement in France and one of its most able and outspoken defenders worldwide." "Zisly, Henri (1872–1945)" by Stefano Boni.

This relationship between anarchism and naturism was quite important at the end of the 1920s in Spain, when "[t]he linking role played by the 'Sol y Vida' group was very important. The goal of this group was to take trips and enjoy the open air. The Naturist athenaeum, 'Ecléctico', in Barcelona, was the base from which the activities of the group were launched. First Etica and then Iniciales, which began in 1929, were the publications of the group, which lasted until the Spanish Civil War. We must be aware that the naturist ideas expressed in them matched the desires that the libertarian youth had of breaking up with the conventions of the bourgeoisie of the time. That is what a young worker explained in a letter to 'Iniciales' He writes it under the odd pseudonym of 'silvestre del campo', (wild man in the country). "I find great pleasure in being naked in the woods, bathed in light and air, two natural elements we cannot do without. By shunning the humble garment of an exploited person, (garments which, in my opinion, are the result of all the laws devised to make our lives bitter), we feel there no others left but just the natural laws. Clothes mean slavery for some and tyranny for others. Only the naked man who rebels against all norms, stands for anarchism, devoid of the prejudices of outfit imposed by our money-oriented society". The relation between anarchism and naturism "gives way to the Naturist Federation, in July 1928, and to the lV Spanish Naturist Congress, in September 1929, both supported by the Libertarian Movement. However, in the short term, the Naturist and Libertarian movements grew apart in their conceptions of everyday life. The Naturist movement felt closer to the Libertarian individualism of some French theoreticians such as Henri Ner (real name of Han Ryner) than to the revolutionary goals proposed by some Anarchist organisations such as the FAI, (Federación Anarquista Ibérica)".

 Individualist anarchism and Friedrich Nietzsche 

The thought of German philosopher Friedrich Nietzsche has been influential in individualist anarchism, specifically in thinkers such as France's Émile Armand, the Italian Renzo Novatore and the Colombian Biofilo Panclasta. Robert C. Holub, author of Nietzsche: Socialist, Anarchist, Feminist posits that "translations of Nietzsche's writings in the United States very likely appeared first in Liberty, the anarchist journal edited by Benjamin Tucker".

 Individualist anarchism in the United States 

 Mutualism and utopianism 

For American anarchist historian Eunice Minette Schuster, "[i]t is apparent [...] that Proudhonian Anarchism was to be found in the United States at least as early as 1848 and that it was not conscious of its affinity to the Individualist Anarchism of Josiah Warren and Stephen Pearl Andrews [...] William B. Greene presented this Proudhonian Mutualism in its purest and most systematic form". William Batchelder Greene is best known for the works Mutual Banking (1850) which proposed an interest-free banking system and Transcendentalism, a critique of the New England philosophical school. He saw mutualism as the synthesis of "liberty and order". His "associationism [...] is checked by individualism. [...] 'Mind your own business,' 'Judge not that ye be not judged.' Over matters which are purely personal, as for example, moral conduct, the individual is sovereign, as well as over that which he himself produces. For this reason he demands 'mutuality' in marriage – the equal right of a woman to her own personal freedom and property and feminist and spiritualist tendencies". Within some individualist anarchist circles, mutualism came to mean non-communist anarchism.

Contemporary American anarchist Hakim Bey reports that "Steven Pearl Andrews [...] was not a fourierist (see Charles Fourier), but he lived through the brief craze for phalansteries in America & adopted a lot of fourierist principles & practices, [...] a maker of worlds out of words. He syncretized Abolitionism, Free Love, spiritual universalism, (Josiah) Warren, & (Charles) Fourier into a grand utopian scheme he called the Universal Pantarchy. [...] He was instrumental in founding several 'intentional communities,' including the 'Brownstone Utopia' on 14th St. in New York, & 'Modern Times' in Brentwood, Long Island. The latter became as famous as the best-known fourierist communes (Brook Farm in Massachusetts & the North American Phalanx in New Jersey) – in fact, Modern Times became downright notorious (for 'Free Love') & finally foundered under a wave of scandalous publicity. Andrews (& Victoria Woodhull) were members of the infamous Section 12 of the 1st International, expelled by Marx for its anarchist, feminist, & spiritualist tendencies".

 Boston anarchists 

Another form of individualist anarchism was found in the United States as advocated by the so-called Boston anarchists. By default, American individualists had no difficulty accepting the concepts that "one man employ another" or that "he direct him", in his labor but rather demanded that "all natural opportunities requisite to the production of wealth be accessible to all on equal terms and that monopolies arising from special privileges created by law be abolished".

They believed state monopoly capitalism (defined as a state-sponsored monopoly) prevented labor from being fully rewarded. Voltairine de Cleyre summed up the philosophy by saying that the anarchist individualists "are firm in the idea that the system of employer and employed, buying and selling, banking, and all the other essential institutions of Commercialism, centred upon private property, are in themselves good, and are rendered vicious merely by the interference of the State".

Even among the 19th-century American individualists, there was not a monolithic doctrine as they disagreed amongst each other on various issues including intellectual property rights and possession versus property in land.Watner, Carl (1977).  . Journal of Libertarian Studies, Vol. 1, No. 4, p. 308. A major schism occurred later in the 19th century when Tucker and some others abandoned their traditional support of natural rights as espoused by Lysander Spooner and converted to an "egoism" modeled upon Max Stirner's philosophy. Lysander Spooner besides his individualist anarchist activism was also an important anti-slavery activist and became a member of the First International.

Some Boston anarchists, including Benjamin Tucker, identified themselves as socialists, which in the 19th century was often used in the sense of a commitment to improving conditions of the working class (i.e. "the labor problem"). The Boston anarchists such as Tucker and his followers continue to be considered socialists due to their opposition to usury. They do so because as the modern economist Jim Stanford points out there are many different kinds of competitive markets such as market socialism and capitalism is only one type of a market economy. By around the start of the 20th century, the heyday of individualist anarchism had passed.

 Individualist anarchism and the labor movement 

George Woodcock reports that the American individualist anarchists Lysander Spooner and William B. Greene had been members of the socialist First International.

Two individualist anarchists who wrote in Benjamin Tucker's Liberty were also important labor organizers of the time. Joseph Labadie was an American labor organizer, individualist anarchist, social activist, printer, publisher, essayist and poet. In 1883, Labadie embraced a non-violent version of individualist anarchism. Without the oppression of the state, Labadie believed, humans would choose to harmonize with "the great natural laws [...] without robbing [their] fellows through interest, profit, rent and taxes". However, he supported community cooperation as he supported community control of water utilities, streets and railroads. Although he did not support the militant anarchism of the Haymarket anarchists, he fought for the clemency of the accused because he did not believe they were the perpetrators. In 1888, Labadie organized the Michigan Federation of Labor, became its first president and forged an alliance with Samuel Gompers. A colleague of Labadie's at Liberty, Dyer Lum was another important individualist anarchist labor activist and poet of the era. A leading anarcho-syndicalist and a prominent left-wing intellectual of the 1880s, he is remembered as the lover and mentor of early anarcha-feminist Voltairine de Cleyre.

Lum was a prolific writer who wrote a number of key anarchist texts and contributed to publications including Mother Earth, Twentieth Century, The Alarm (the journal of the International Working People's Association) and The Open Court among others. Lum's political philosophy was a fusion of individualist anarchist economics—"a radicalized form of laissez-faire economics" inspired by the Boston anarchists—with radical labor organization similar to that of the Chicago anarchists of the time. Herbert Spencer and Pierre-Joseph Proudhon influenced Lum strongly in his individualist tendency. He developed a "mutualist" theory of unions and as such was active within the Knights of Labor and later promoted anti-political strategies in the American Federation of Labor. Frustration with abolitionism, spiritualism and labor reform caused Lum to embrace anarchism and radicalize workers. Convinced of the necessity of violence to enact social change he volunteered to fight in the American Civil War, hoping thereby to bring about the end of slavery. Kevin Carson has praised Lum's fusion of individualist laissez-faire economics with radical labor activism as "creative" and described him as "more significant than any in the Boston group".

 Egoist anarchism 

Some of the American individualist anarchists later in this era such as Benjamin Tucker abandoned natural rights positions and converted to Max Stirner's egoist anarchism. Rejecting the idea of moral rights, Tucker said that there were only two rights, "the right of might" and "the right of contract". He also said after converting to Egoist individualism that "[i]n times past [...] it was my habit to talk glibly of the right of man to land. It was a bad habit, and I long ago sloughed it off [...] Man's only right to land is his might over it". In adopting Stirnerite egoism in 1886, Tucker rejected natural rights which had long been considered the foundation of libertarianism in the United States. This rejection galvanized the movement into fierce debates, with the natural rights proponents accusing the egoists of destroying libertarianism itself. So bitter was the conflict that a number of natural rights proponents withdrew from the pages of Liberty in protest even though they had hitherto been among its frequent contributors. Thereafter, Liberty championed egoism although its general content did not change significantly.

Several periodicals were undoubtedly influenced by Liberty's presentation of egoism. They included I published by Clarence Lee Swartz, edited by William Walstein Gordak and J. William Lloyd (all associates of Liberty); and The Ego and The Egoist, both of which were edited by Edward H. Fulton. Among the egoist papers that Tucker followed were the German Der Eigene, edited by Adolf Brand; and The Eagle and The Serpent, issued from London. The latter, the most prominent English-language egoist journal, was published from 1898 to 1900 with the subtitle "A Journal of Egoistic Philosophy and Sociology".

American anarchists who adhered to egoism include Benjamin Tucker, John Beverley Robinson, Steven T. Byington, Hutchins Hapgood, James L. Walker, Victor Yarros and Edward H. Fulton. Robinson wrote an essay called "Egoism" in which he states that "[m]odern egoism, as propounded by Stirner and Nietzsche, and expounded by Ibsen, Shaw and others, is all these; but it is more. It is the realization by the individual that they are an individual; that, as far as they are concerned, they are the only individual". Walker published the work The Philosophy of Egoism in which he argued that egoism "implies a rethinking of the self-other relationship, nothing less than 'a complete revolution in the relations of mankind' that avoids both the 'archist' principle that legitimates domination and the 'moralist' notion that elevates self-renunciation to a virtue. Walker describes himself as an 'egoistic anarchist' who believed in both contract and cooperation as practical principles to guide everyday interactions". For Walker, "what really defines egoism is not mere self-interest, pleasure, or greed; it is the sovereignty of the individual, the full expression of the subjectivity of the individual ego".

Italian anti-organizationalist individualist anarchism was brought to the United States by Italian born individualists such as Giuseppe Ciancabilla and others who advocated for violent propaganda by the deed there. Anarchist historian George Woodcock reports the incident in which the important Italian social anarchist Errico Malatesta became involved "in a dispute with the individualist anarchists of Paterson, who insisted that anarchism implied no organization at all, and that every man must act solely on his impulses. At last, in one noisy debate, the individual impulse of a certain Ciancabilla directed him to shoot Malatesta, who was badly wounded but obstinately refused to name his assailant".

Enrico Arrigoni (pseudonym Frank Brand) was an Italian American individualist anarchist Lathe operator, house painter, bricklayer, dramatist and political activist influenced by the work of Max Stirner.Paul Avrich. Anarchist Voices: An Oral History of Anarchism in America. He took the pseudonym Brand from a fictional character in one of Henrik Ibsen's plays. In the 1910s, he started becoming involved in anarchist and anti-war activism around Milan. From the 1910s until the 1920s, he participated in anarchist activities and popular uprisings in various countries including Switzerland, Germany, Hungary, Argentina and Cuba. He lived from the 1920s onwards in New York City, where he edited the individualist anarchist eclectic journal Eresia in 1928. He also wrote for other American anarchist publications such as L' Adunata dei refrattari, Cultura Obrera, Controcorrente and Intesa Libertaria. During the Spanish Civil War, he went to fight with the anarchists, but he was imprisoned and was helped on his release by Emma Goldman. Afterwards, Arrigoni became a longtime member of the Libertarian Book Club in New York City. His written works include The Totalitarian Nightmare (1975), The Lunacy of the Superman (1977), Adventures in the Country of the Monoliths (1981) and Freedom: My Dream (1986).

 Post-left anarchy and insurrectionary anarchism 

Murray Bookchin identified post-left anarchy as a form of individualist anarchism in Social Anarchism or Lifestyle Anarchism: An Unbridgeable Chasm where he identifies "a shift among Euro-American anarchists away from social anarchism and toward individualist or lifestyle anarchism. Indeed, lifestyle anarchism today is finding its principal expression in spray-can graffiti, post-modernist nihilism, antirationalism, neoprimitivism, anti-technologism, neo-Situationist 'cultural terrorism', mysticism, and a 'practice' of staging Foucauldian 'personal insurrections'". Post-left anarchist Bob Black in his long critique of Bookchin's philosophy called Anarchy After Leftism said about post-left anarchy that "[i]t is, unlike Bookchinism, "individualistic" in the sense that if the freedom and happiness of the individual – i.e., each and every really existing person, every Tom, Dick and Murray – is not the measure of the good society, what is?"

A strong relationship does exist between post-left anarchism and the work of individualist anarchist Max Stirner. Jason McQuinn says that "when I (and other anti-ideological anarchists) criticize ideology, it is always from a specifically critical, anarchist perspective rooted in both the skeptical, individualist-anarchist philosophy of Max Stirner. Bob Black and Feral Faun/Wolfi Landstreicher also strongly adhere to stirnerist egoist anarchism. Bob Black has humorously suggested the idea of "marxist stirnerism".

Hakim Bey has said that "[f]rom Stirner's 'Union of Self-Owning Ones' we proceed to Nietzsche's circle of 'Free Spirits' and thence to Charles Fourier's 'Passional Series', doubling and redoubling ourselves even as the Other multiplies itself in the eros of the group". Bey also wrote that "[t]he Mackay Society, of which Mark & I are active members, is devoted to the anarchism of Max Stirner, Benj. Tucker & John Henry Mackay. [...] The Mackay Society, incidentally, represents a little-known current of individualist thought which never cut its ties with revolutionary labor. Dyer Lum, Ezra & Angela Haywood represent this school of thought; Jo Labadie, who wrote for Tucker's Liberty, made himself a link between the American 'plumb-line' anarchists, the 'philosophical' individualists, & the syndicalist or communist branch of the movement; his influence reached the Mackay Society through his son, Laurance. Like the Italian Stirnerites (who influenced us through our late friend Enrico Arrigoni) we support all anti-authoritarian currents, despite their apparent contradictions".

As far as posterior individualist anarchists, Jason McQuinn for some time used the pseudonym Lev Chernyi in honor of the Russian individualist anarchist of the same name while Feral Faun has quoted Italian individualist anarchist Renzo Novatore and has translated both Novatore and the young Italian individualist anarchist Bruno Filippi

Egoism has had a strong influence on insurrectionary anarchism as can be seen in the work of Wolfi Landstreicher. Feral Faun wrote in 1995:
In the game of insurgence – a lived guerilla war game – it is strategically necessary to use identities and roles. Unfortunately, the context of social relationships gives these roles and identities the power to define the individual who attempts to use them. So I, Feral Faun, became [...] an anarchist, [...] a writer, [...] a Stirner-influenced, post-situationist, anti-civilization theorist, [...] if not in my own eyes, at least in the eyes of most people who've read my writings.

 Individualist anarchism in Europe 

European individualist anarchism proceeded from the roots laid by William Godwin, Pierre-Joseph Proudhon and Max Stirner. Proudhon was an early pioneer of anarchism as well as of the important individualist anarchist current of mutualism. Stirner became a central figure of individualist anarchism through the publication of his seminal work The Ego and Its Own which is considered to be "a founding text in the tradition of individualist anarchism". Another early figure was Anselme Bellegarrigue. Individualist anarchism expanded and diversified through Europe, incorporating influences from North American individualist anarchism.

European individualist anarchists include Albert Libertad, Bellegarrigue, Oscar Wilde, Émile Armand, Lev Chernyi, John Henry Mackay, Han Ryner, Adolf Brand, Miguel Giménez Igualada, Renzo Novatore and currently Michel Onfray. Important currents within it include free love, anarcho-naturism and illegalism.

 France 

From the legacy of Proudhon and Stirner there emerged a strong tradition of French individualist anarchism. An early important individualist anarchist was Anselme Bellegarrigue. He participated in the French Revolution of 1848, was author and editor of Anarchie, Journal de l'Ordre and Au fait ! Au fait ! Interprétation de l'idée démocratique and wrote the important early Anarchist Manifesto in 1850. Catalan historian of individualist anarchism Xavier Diez reports that during his travels in the United States "he at least contacted (Henry David) Thoreau and, probably (Josiah) Warren". Autonomie Individuelle was an individualist anarchist publication that ran from 1887 to 1888. It was edited by Jean-Baptiste Louiche, Charles Schæffer and Georges Deherme.

Later, this tradition continued with such intellectuals as Albert Libertad, André Lorulot, Émile Armand, Victor Serge, Zo d'Axa and Rirette Maîtrejean, who in 1905 developed theory in the main individualist anarchist journal in France, L'Anarchie. Outside this journal, Han Ryner wrote Petit Manuel individualiste (1903). In 1891, Zo d'Axa created the journal L'En-Dehors.

Anarcho-naturism was promoted by Henri Zisly, Émile Gravelle and Georges Butaud. Butaud was an individualist "partisan of the milieux libres, publisher of 'Flambeau' ('an enemy of authority') in 1901 in Vienna" and most of his energies were devoted to creating anarchist colonies (communautés expérimentales) in which he participated in several.

In this sense, "the theoretical positions and the vital experiences of [F]rench individualism are deeply iconoclastic and scandalous, even within libertarian circles. The call of nudist naturism, the strong defence of birth control methods, the idea of "unions of egoists" with the sole justification of sexual practices, that will try to put in practice, not without difficulties, will establish a way of thought and action, and will result in sympathy within some, and a strong rejection within others".

French individualist anarchists grouped behind Émile Armand, published L'Unique after World War II. L'Unique went from 1945 to 1956 with a total of 110 numbers.Unique, L' (1945–1956) Gérard de Lacaze-Duthiers was a French writer, art critic, pacifist and anarchist. Lacaze-Duthiers, an art critic for the Symbolist review journal La Plume, was influenced by Oscar Wilde, Friedrich Nietzsche and Max Stirner. His (1906) L'Ideal Humain de l'Art helped found the "artistocracy movement"—a movement advocating life in the service of art. His ideal was an anti-elitist aestheticism: "All men should be artists". Together with André Colomer and Manuel Devaldes, in 1913 he founded L'Action d'Art, an anarchist literary journal. After World War II, he contributed to the journal L'Unique. Within the synthesist anarchist organization, the Fédération Anarchiste, there existed an individualist anarchist tendency alongside anarcho-communist and anarchosyndicalist currents. Individualist anarchists participating inside the Fédération Anarchiste included Charles-Auguste Bontemps, Georges Vincey and André Arru. The new base principles of the francophone Anarchist Federation were written by the individualist anarchist Charles-Auguste Bontemps and the anarcho-communist Maurice Joyeux which established an organization with a plurality of tendencies and autonomy of federated groups organized around synthesist principles. Charles-Auguste Bontemps was a prolific author mainly in the anarchist, freethinking, pacifist and naturist press of the time. His view on anarchism was based around his concept of "Social Individualism" on which he wrote extensively. He defended an anarchist perspective which consisted on "a collectivism of things and an individualism of persons".

In 2002, Libertad organized a new version of the L'EnDehors, collaborating with Green Anarchy and including several contributors, such as Lawrence Jarach, Patrick Mignard, Thierry Lodé, Ron Sakolsky and Thomas Slut. Numerous articles about capitalism, human rights, free love and social fights were published. The EnDehors continues now as a website, EnDehors.org.

The prolific contemporary French philosopher Michel Onfray has been writing from an individualist anarchist"Au-delà, l'éthique et la politique de Michel Onfray font signe vers l'anarchisme individualiste de la Belle Epoque qui est d'ailleurs une de ses références explicites.""Individualité et rapports à l'engagement militant Individualite et rapports a l engageme".. par : Pereira Irène perspective influenced by Nietzsche, French post-structuralists thinkers such as Michel Foucault and Gilles Deleuze; and Greek classical schools of philosophy such as the Cynics and Cyrenaics. Among the books which best expose Onfray's individualist anarchist perspective include La sculpture de soi : la morale esthétique (The Sculpture of Oneself: Aesthetic Morality), La philosophie féroce : exercices anarchistes, La puissance d'exister and Physiologie de Georges Palante, portrait d'un nietzchéen de gauche which focuses on French individualist philosopher Georges Palante.

 Illegalism 

Illegalism is an anarchist philosophy that developed primarily in France, Italy, Belgium and Switzerland during the early 1900s as an outgrowth of Stirner's individualist anarchism. Illegalists usually did not seek moral basis for their actions, recognizing only the reality of "might" rather than "right"; and for the most part, illegal acts were done simply to satisfy personal desires, not for some greater ideal, although some committed crimes as a form of propaganda of the deed. The illegalists embraced direct action and propaganda of the deed.

Influenced by theorist Max Stirner's egoism as well as Pierre-Joseph Proudhon (his view that "property is theft!"), Clément Duval and Marius Jacob proposed the theory of la reprise individuelle (individual reclamation) which justified robbery on the rich and personal direct action against exploiters and the system.

Illegalism first rose to prominence among a generation of Europeans inspired by the unrest of the 1890s, during which Ravachol, Émile Henry, Auguste Vaillant and Sante Geronimo Caserio committed daring crimes in the name of anarchism in what is known as propaganda of the deed. France's Bonnot Gang was the most famous group to embrace illegalism.

 Germany 

In Germany, the Scottish-German John Henry Mackay became the most important propagandist for individualist anarchist ideas. He fused Stirnerist egoism with the positions of Benjamin Tucker and actually translated Tucker into German. Two semi-fictional writings of his own, Die Anarchisten and Der Freiheitsucher, contributed to individualist theory through an updating of egoist themes within a consideration of the anarchist movement. English translations of these works arrived in the United Kingdom and in individualist American circles led by Tucker. Mackay is also known as an important European early activist for gay rights. Using the pseudonym Sagitta, Mackay wrote a series of works for pederastic emancipation, titled Die Buecher der namenlosen Liebe (Books of the Nameless Love). This series was conceived in 1905 and completed in 1913 and included the Fenny Skaller, a story of a pederast. Under the same pseudonym, he also published fiction, such as Holland (1924) and a pederastic novel of the Berlin boy-bars, Der Puppenjunge (The Hustler) (1926).

Adolf Brand was a German writer, Stirnerist anarchist and pioneering campaigner for the acceptance of male bisexuality and homosexuality. In 1896, Brand published a German homosexual periodical, Der Eigene. This was the first ongoing homosexual publication in the world. The name was taken from writings of egoist philosopher Max Stirner (who had greatly influenced the young Brand) and refers to Stirner's concept of "self-ownership" of the individual. Der Eigene concentrated on cultural and scholarly material and may have had an average of around 1,500 subscribers per issue during its lifetime, although the exact numbers are uncertain. Contributors included Erich Mühsam, Kurt Hiller, John Henry Mackay (under the pseudonym Sagitta) and artists Wilhelm von Gloeden, Fidus and Sascha Schneider. Brand contributed many poems and articles himself. Benjamin Tucker followed this journal from the United States.Der Einzige was a German individualist anarchist magazine. It appeared in 1919 as a weekly, then sporadically until 1925 and was edited by cousins Anselm Ruest (pseudonym for Ernst Samuel) and Mynona (pseudonym for Salomo Friedlaender). Its title was adopted from the book Der Einzige und sein Eigentum (The Ego and Its Own) by Max Stirner. Another influence was the thought of German philosopher Friedrich Nietzsche. The publication was connected to the local expressionist artistic current and the transition from it towards Dada.

 Italy 

In Italy, individualist anarchism had a strong tendency towards illegalism and violent propaganda by the deed similar to French individualist anarchism, but perhaps more extreme"At this point, encouraged by the disillusionment that followed the breakdown of the general strike, the terrorist individualists who had always – despite Malatesta's influence – survived as a small minority among Italian anarchists, intervened frightfully and tragically." George Woodcock. Anarchism: A History of Libertarian Ideas and Movements. 1962. and which emphazised criticism of organization be it anarchist or of other type. In this respect, we can consider notorious magnicides carried out or attempted by individualists Giovanni Passannante, Sante Caserio, Michele Angiolillo, Luigi Lucheni and Gaetano Bresci who murdered King Umberto I. Caserio lived in France and coexisted within French illegalism and later assassinated French President Sadi Carnot. The theoretical seeds of current insurrectionary anarchism were already laid out at the end of 19th century Italy in a combination of individualist anarchism criticism of permanent groups and organization with a socialist class struggle worldview. During the rise of fascism, this thought also motivated Gino Lucetti, Michele Schirru and Angelo Sbardellotto in attempting the assassination of Benito Mussolini.

During the early 20th century, the intellectual work of individualist anarchist Renzo Novatore came to importance and he was influenced by Max Stirner, Friedrich Nietzsche, Georges Palante, Oscar Wilde, Henrik Ibsen, Arthur Schopenhauer and Charles Baudelaire. He collaborated in numerous anarchist journals and participated in futurism avant-garde currents. In his thought, he adhered to Stirnerist disrespect for private property, only recognizing property of one's own spirit. Novatore collaborated in the individualist anarchist journal Iconoclasta! alongside the young Stirnerist illegalist Bruno Filippi.

The individualist philosopher and poet Renzo Novatore belonged to the leftist section of the avant-garde movement of futurism alongside other individualist anarcho-futurists such as Dante Carnesecchi, Leda Rafanelli, Auro d'Arcola and Giovanni Governato. There was also Pietro Bruzzi who published the journal L'Individualista in the 1920s alongside Ugo Fedeli and Francesco Ghezzi, but who fell to fascist forces later. Bruzzi also collaborated with the Italian American individualist anarchist publication Eresia of New York City edited by Enrico Arrigoni.

During the Founding Congress of the Italian Anarchist Federation in 1945, there was a group of individualist anarchists led by Cesare Zaccaria who was an important anarchist of the time. Later during the IX Congress of the Italian Anarchist Federation in Carrara in 1965, a group decided to split off from this organization and created the Gruppi di Iniziativa Anarchica. In the 1970s, it was mostly composed of "veteran individualist anarchists with an of pacifism orientation, naturism".

In the famous Italian insurrectionary anarchist essay written by an anonymous writer, "At Daggers Drawn with the Existent, its Defenders and its False Critics", there reads how "[t]he workers who, during a wildcat strike, carried a banner saying, 'We are not asking for anything' understood that the defeat is in the claim itself ('the claim against the enemy is eternal'). There is no alternative but to take everything. As Stirner said: 'No matter how much you give them, they will always ask for more, because what they want is no less than the end of every concession'". The contemporary imprisoned Italian insurrectionary anarchist philosopher Michele Fabiani writes from an explicit individualist anarchist perspective in such essays as Critica individualista anarchica alla modernità ("Individualist Anarchist Critique of Modernity"). Horst Fantazzini (March 4, 1939 – December 24, 2001) was an Italian-German individualist anarchist who pursued an illegalist lifestyle and practice until his death in 2001. He gained media notoriety mainly due to his many bank robberies through Italy and other countries. In 1999, the film Ormai è fatta! appeared based on his life.

 Russia 
Individualist anarchism was one of the three categories of anarchism in Russia, along with the more prominent anarcho-communism and anarcho-syndicalism. The ranks of the Russian individualist anarchists were predominantly drawn from the intelligentsia and the working class. For anarchist historian Paul Avrich, "[t]he two leading exponents of individualist anarchism, both based in Moscow, were Aleksei Alekseevich Borovoi and Lev Chernyi (born Pavel Dmitrievich Turchaninov). From Nietzsche, they inherited the desire for a complete overturn of all values accepted by bourgeois society political, moral, and cultural. Furthermore, strongly influenced by Max Stirner and Benjamin Tucker, the German and American theorists of individualist anarchism, they demanded the total liberation of the human personality from the fetters of organized society".

Some Russian individualists anarchists "found the ultimate expression of their social alienation in violence and crime, others attached themselves to avant-garde literary and artistic circles, but the majority remained "philosophical" anarchists who conducted animated parlor discussions and elaborated their individualist theories in ponderous journals and books".

Lev Chernyi was an important individualist anarchist involved in resistance against the rise to power of the Bolshevik Party as he adhered mainly to Stirner and the ideas of Tucker. In 1907, he published a book entitled Associational Anarchism in which he advocated the "free association of independent individuals". On his return from Siberia in 1917, he enjoyed great popularity among Moscow workers as a lecturer. Chernyi was also Secretary of the Moscow Federation of Anarchist Groups, which was formed in March 1917. He was an advocate "for the seizure of private homes", which was an activity seen by the anarchists after the October Revolution as direct expropriation on the bourgoise. He died after being accused of participation in an episode in which this group bombed the headquarters of the Moscow Committee of the Communist Party. Although most likely not being really involved in the bombing, he might have died of torture.

Chernyi advocated a Nietzschean overthrow of the values of bourgeois Russian society, and rejected the voluntary communes of anarcho-communist Peter Kropotkin as a threat to the freedom of the individual. Scholars including Avrich and Allan Antliff have interpreted this vision of society to have been greatly influenced by the individualist anarchists Max Stirner and Benjamin Tucker. Subsequent to the book's publication, Chernyi was imprisoned in Siberia under the Russian Czarist regime for his revolutionary activities.

On the other hand, Alexei Borovoi was a professor of philosophy at Moscow University, "a gifted orator and the author of numerous books, pamphlets, and articles which attempted to reconcile individualist anarchism with the doctrines of syndicallism". He wrote among other theoretical works Anarkhizm in 1918, just after the October Revolution; and Anarchism and Law. For him, "the chief importance is given not to Anarchism as the aim but to Anarchy as the continuous quest for the aim". He manifests there that "[n]o social ideal, from the point of view of anarchism, could be referred to as absolute in a sense that supposes it's the crown of human wisdom, the end of social and ethical quest of man".

 Spain 
While Spain was influenced by American individualist anarchism, it was more closely related to the French currents. Around the start of the 20th century, individualism in Spain gathered force through the efforts of people such as Dorado Montero, Ricardo Mella, Federico Urales, Miguel Giménez Igualada, Mariano Gallardo and J. Elizalde who translated French and American individualists. Important in this respect were also magazines such as La Idea Libre, La Revista Blanca, Etica, Iniciales, Al margen, Estudios and Nosotros. The most influential thinkers there were Max Stirner, Émile Armand and Han Ryner. Just as in France, the spread of Esperanto and anationalism had importance just as naturism and free love currents. Later, Armand and Ryner themselves started writing in the Spanish individualist press. Armand's concept of amorous camaraderie had an important role in motivating polyamory as realization of the individual.

Catalan historian Xavier Diez reports that the Spanish individualist anarchist press was widely read by members of anarcho-communist groups and by members of the anarcho-syndicalist trade union CNT. There were also the cases of prominent individualist anarchists such as Federico Urales and Miguel Giménez Igualada who were members of the CNT and J. Elizalde who was a founding member and first secretary of the Iberian Anarchist Federation (IAF).

Spanish individualist anarchist Miguel Giménez Igualada wrote the lengthy theory book called Anarchism espousing his individualist anarchism. Between October 1937 and February 1938, he was editor of the individualist anarchist magazine Nosotros in which many works of Armand and Ryner appeared. He also participated in the publishing of another individualist anarchist maganize Al Margen: Publicación quincenal individualista. In his youth, he engaged in illegalist activities. His thought was deeply influenced by Max Stirner, of which he was the main popularizer in Spain through his own writings. He published and wrote the preface to the fourth edition in Spanish of The Ego and Its Own from 1900. He proposed the creation of a "Union of egoists" to be a federation of individualist anarchists in Spain, but it did not succeed. In 1956, he published an extensive treatise on Stirner, dedicated to fellow individualist anarchist Émile Armand. Afterwards, he traveled and lived in Argentina, Uruguay and Mexico.

Federico Urales was an important individualist anarchist who edited La Revista Blanca. The individualist anarchism of Urales was influenced by Auguste Comte and Charles Darwin. He saw science and reason as a defense against blind servitude to authority. He was critical of influential individualist thinkers such as Nietzsche and Stirner for promoting an asocial egoist individualism and instead promoted an individualism with solidarity seen as a way to guarantee social equality and harmony. He was highly critical of anarcho-syndicalism, which he viewed as plagued by excessive bureaucracy; and he thought that it tended towards reformism. Instead, he favored small groups based on ideological alignment. He supported and participated in the establishment of the IAF in 1927.

In 1956, Miguel Giménez Igualada—on exile escaping from Franco's dictatorship—published an extensive treatise on Stirner which he dedicated to fellow individualist anarchist Émile Armand. On the subject of individualist anarchist theory, he publisheds Anarchism in 1968 during his exile in Mexico from Franco's dictatorship in Spain. He was present in the First Congress of the Mexican Anarchist Federation in 1945.

In 2000, Ateneo Libertario Ricardo Mella, Ateneo Libertario Al Margen, Ateneu Enciclopèdic Popular, Ateneo Libertario de Sant Boi and Ateneu Llibertari Poble Sec y Fundació D'Estudis Llibertaris i Anarcosindicalistes republished Émile Armand's writings on free love and individualist anarchism in a compilation titled Individualist anarchism and Amorous camaraderie. Recently, Spanish historian Xavier Diez has dedicated extensive research on Spanish individualist anarchism as can be seen in his books El anarquismo individualista en España: 1923–1938 and Utopia sexual a la premsa anarquista de Catalunya. La revista Ética-Iniciales(1927–1937) which deals with free love thought as present in the Spanish individualist anarchist magazine Iniciales.

 United Kingdom 

The English Enlightenment political theorist William Godwin was an important influence as mentioned before. The Irish anarchist writer of the Decadent Movement Oscar Wilde influenced individualist anarchists such as Renzo Novatore and gained the admiration of Benjamin Tucker. In his important essay The Soul of Man under Socialism from 1891, Wilde defended socialism as the way to guarantee individualism and so he saw that "[w]ith the abolition of private property, then, we shall have true, beautiful, healthy Individualism. Nobody will waste his life in accumulating things, and the symbols for things. One will live. To live is the rarest thing in the world. Most people exist, that is all". For anarchist historian George Woodcock, "Wilde's aim in The Soul of Man under Socialism is to seek the society most favorable to the artist [...] for Wilde art is the supreme end, containing within itself enlightenment and regeneration, to which all else in society must be subordinated [...] Wilde represents the anarchist as aesthete". Woodcock finds that "[t]he most ambitious contribution to literary anarchism during the 1890s was undoubtedly Oscar Wilde The Soul of Man under Socialism" and finds that it is influenced mainly by the thought of William Godwin.

In the late 19th century in the United Kingdom, there existed individualist anarchists such as Wordsworth Donisthorpe, Joseph Hiam Levy, Joseph Greevz Fisher, John Badcock Jr., Albert Tarn and Henry Albert Seymour who were close to the United States group around Benjamin Tucker's magazine Liberty. In the mid-1880s, Seymour published a journal called The Anarchist and also later took a special interest in free love as he participated in the journal The Adult: A Journal for the Advancement of Freedom in Sexual Relationships. The Serpent, issued from London, was the most prominent English-language egoist journal and published from 1898 to 1900 with the subtitle "A Journal of Egoistic Philosophy and Sociology". Henry Meulen was another British anarchist who was notable for his support of free banking.

In the United Kingdom, Herbert Read was influenced highly by egoism as he later approached existentialism (see existentialist anarchism). Albert Camus devoted a section of The Rebel to Stirner. Although throughout his book Camus is concerned to present "the rebel" as a preferred alternative to "the revolutionary", he nowhere acknowledges that this distinction is taken from the one that Stirner makes between "the revolutionary" and "the insurrectionist". Sidney Parker is a British egoist individualist anarchist who wrote articles and edited anarchist journals from 1963 to 1993 such as Minus One, Egoist, and Ego. Donald Rooum is an English anarchist cartoonist and writer with a long association with Freedom Press. Rooum stated that for his thought, "[t]he most influential source is Max Stirner. I am happy to be called a Stirnerite anarchist, provided 'Stirnerite' means one who agrees with Stirner's general drift, not one who agrees with Stirner's every word". An Anarchist FAQ reports: "From meeting anarchists in Glasgow during the Second World War, long-time anarchist activist and artist Donald Rooum likewise combined Stirner and anarcho-communism".

In the hybrid of post-structuralism and anarchism called post-anarchism, Saul Newman has written a lot on Stirner and his similarities to post-structuralism. He writes:
Max Stirner's impact on contemporary political theory is often neglected. However in Stirner's political thinking there can be found a surprising convergence with poststructuralist theory, particularly with regard to the function of power. Andrew Koch, for instance, sees Stirner as a thinker who transcends the Hegelian tradition he is usually placed in, arguing that his work is a precursor poststructuralist ideas about the foundations of knowledge and truth.

Newman has published several essays on Stirner. "War on the State: Stirner and Deleuze's Anarchism" and "Empiricism, Pluralism, and Politics in Deleuze and Stirner" discusses what he sees are similarities between Stirner's thought and that of Gilles Deleuze. In "Spectres of Stirner: A Contemporary Critique of Ideology", he discusses the conception of ideology in Stirner. In "Stirner and Foucault: Toward a Post-Kantian Freedom", similarities between Stirner and Michel Foucault. He also wrote "Politics of the Ego: Stirner's Critique of Liberalism".

 Individualist anarchism in Latin America 
Argentine anarchist historian Ángel Cappelletti reports that in Argentina "[a]mong the workers that came from Europe in the 2 first decades of the century, there was curiously some stirnerian individualists influenced by the philosophy of Nietzsche, that saw syndicalism as a potential enemy of anarchist ideology. They established [...] affinity groups that in 1912 came to, according to Max Nettlau, to the number of 20. In 1911 there appeared, in Colón, the periodical El Único, that defined itself as 'Publicación individualista'".

Vicente Rojas Lizcano, whose pseudonym was Biófilo Panclasta, was a Colombian individualist anarchist writer and activist. In 1904, he began using the name Biofilo Panclasta. Biofilo in Spanish stands for "lover of life" and Panclasta for "enemy of all". He visited more than fifty countries propagandizing for anarchism which in his case was highly influenced by the thought of Stirner and Nietszche. Among his written works there are Siete años enterrado vivo en una de las mazmorras de Gomezuela: Horripilante relato de un resucitado(1932) and Mis prisiones, mis destierros y mi vida (1929) which talk about his many adventures while living his life as an adventurer, activist and vagabond as well as his thought and the many times he was imprisoned in different countries.

Maria Lacerda de Moura was a Brazilian teacher, journalist, anarcha-feminist and individualist anarchist. Her ideas regarding education were largely influenced by Francisco Ferrer. She later moved to São Paulo and became involved in journalism for the anarchist and labor press. There she also lectured on topics including education, women's rights, free love and antimilitarism. Her writings and essays garnered her attention not only in Brazil, but also in Argentina and Uruguay. In February 1923, she launched Renascença, a periodical linked with the anarchist, progressive and freethinking circles of the period. Her thought was mainly influenced by individualist anarchists such as Han Ryner and Émile Armand. She maintained contact with Spanish individualist anarchist circles.

Horst Matthai Quelle was a Spanish language German anarchist philosopher influenced by Max Stirner. In 1938, at the beginning of the German economic crisis and the rise of Nazism and fascism in Europe, Quelle moved to Mexico. Quelle earned his undergraduate degree, master's and doctorate in philosophy at the National Autonomous University of Mexico, where he returned as a professor of philosophy in the 1980s. He argued that since the individual gives form to the world, he is those objects, the others and the whole universe. One of his main views was a "theory of infinite worlds" which for him was developed by pre-Socratic philosophers.

During the 1990s in Argentina, there appeared a Stirnerist publication called El Único: publicacion periódica de pensamiento individualista.

 Criticism 

Murray Bookchin criticized individualist anarchism for its opposition to democracy and its embrace of "lifestylism" at the expense of anti-capitalism and class struggle. Bookchin claimed that individualist anarchism supports only negative liberty and rejects the idea of positive liberty. Albert Meltzer proposed that individualist anarchism differs radically from revolutionary anarchism and that it "is sometimes too readily conceded 'that this is, after all, anarchism'". Meltzer claimed that Benjamin Tucker's acceptance of the use of a private police force (including to break up violent strikes to protect the "employer's 'freedom'") is contradictory to the definition of anarchism as "no government". Meltzer opposed anarcho-capitalism for similar reasons, arguing that it actually supports a "limited State" and that "it is only possible to conceive of Anarchism which is free, communistic and offering no economic necessity for repression of countering it". Tucker's views of strikes and trade unions evolved from skepticism, believing that strikes should be organized by free workers rather than by bureaucratic union officials and organizations, to sympathize with those involved in the Haymarket massacre.

George Bernard Shaw initially had flirtations with individualist anarchism before coming to the conclusion that it was "the negation of socialism, and is, in fact, unsocialism carried as near to its logical conclusion as any sane man dare carry it". Shaw's argument was that even if wealth was initially distributed equally, the degree of laissez-faire advocated by Tucker would result in the distribution of wealth becoming unequal because it would permit private appropriation and accumulation. According to Carlotta Anderson, American individualist anarchists accept that free competition results in unequal wealth distribution, but they "do not see that as an injustice". Tucker explained that "[i]f I go through life free and rich, I shall not cry because my neighbor, equally free, is richer. Liberty will ultimately make all men rich; it will not make all men equally rich. Authority may (and may not) make all men equally rich in purse; it certainly will make them equally poor in all that makes life best worth living". Nonetheless, Peter Marshall states that "the egalitarian implications of traditional individualist anarchists" such as Tucker and Lysander Spooner have been overlooked.

Collectivist and social anarchists dispute the individualist anarchist claim that free competition and markets would yield the libertarian-egalitarian anarchist society that individualist anarchists share with them. In their views, "state intervention merely props up a system of class exploitation and gives capitalism a human face".

The authors of An Anarchist FAQ argue that individualist anarchists did not advocate free competition and markets as normative claims and merely thought those were better means than the ones proposed by anarcho-communists for the development of an anarchist society. Individualist anarchists such as Tucker thought interests, profits, rents and usury would disappear, something that both anarcho-capitalists such as Murray Rothbard and social anarchists did not think was true or believe would not happen. In a free market, people would be paid in proportion to how much labor they exerted and that exploitation or usury was taking place if they were not. The theory was that unregulated banking would cause more money to be available and that this would allow proliferation of new businesses which would in turn raise demand for labor. This led Tucker to believe that the labor theory of value would be vindicated and equal amounts of labor would receive equal pay. Later in his life, Tucker grew skeptical that free competition could remove concentrated capital.

 Individualist anarchism and anarcho-capitalism 

While anarcho-capitalism is sometimes described as a form of individualist anarchism, scholars have criticized those, including some Marxists and right-libertarians, for taking it at face value. Other scholars such as Benjamin Franks, who considers anarcho-capitalism part of individualist anarchism and hence excludes those forms of individualist anarchism that defend or reinforce hierarchical forms from the anarchist camp, have been criticized by those who include individualist anarchism as part of the anarchist and socialist traditions whilst excluding anarcho-capitalism, including the authors of An Anarchist FAQ. Some anarchist scholars criticized those, especially in Anglo-American philosophy, who define anarchism only in terms of opposition to the state, when anarchism, including both individualist and social traditions, is much more than that.McLaughlin, Paul (2007). Anarchism and Authority: A Philosophical Introduction to Classical Anarchism. Ashgate. pp. 28–166. . "Anarchists do reject the state, as we will see. But to claim that this central aspect of anarchism is definitive is to sell anarchism short. [...] [Opposition to the state] is (contrary to what many scholars believe) not definitive of anarchism."Franks, Benjamin (August 2013). Freeden, Michael; Stears, Marc (eds.). "Anarchism". The Oxford Handbook of Political Ideologies. Oxford University Press: 385–404. . "[M]any, questionably, regard anti-statism as the irremovable, universal principle at the core of anarchism. [...] The fact that [anarchists and anarcho-capitalists] share a core concept of 'anti-statism', which is often advanced as [...] a commonality between them [...], is insufficient to produce a shared identity [...] because [they interpret] the concept of state-rejection [...] differently despite the initial similarity in nomenclature" (pp. 386–388). Anarchists, including both individualist and social anarchists, also criticized some Marxists and other socialists for excluding anarchism from the socialist camp. In European Socialism: A History of Ideas and Movements, Carl Landauer summarized the difference between communist and individualist anarchists by stating that "the communist anarchists also do not acknowledge any right to society to force the individual. They differ from the anarchistic individualists in their belief that men, if freed from coercion, will enter into voluntary associations of a communistic type, while the other wing believes that the free person will prefer a high degree of isolation".Landauer, Carl (1960). European Socialism: A History of Ideas and Movements. University of California Press. p. 127.

Without the labor theory of value, some argue that 19th-century individualist anarchists approximate the modern movement of anarcho-capitalism,Outhwaite, William (2003). The Blackwell Dictionary of Modern Social Thought. "Anarchism". Hoboken: Wiley-Blackwell. p. 13. . "Their successors today, such as Murray Rothbard, having abandoned the labor theory of value, describe themselves as anarcho-capitalists." although this has been contested or rejected.Wieck, David (1978). "Anarchist Justice". In Chapman, John W.; Pennock, J. Roland Pennock, eds. Anarchism: Nomos XIX. New York: New York University Press. pp. 227–228. "Out of the history of anarchist thought and action Rothbard has pulled forth a single thread, the thread of individualism, and defines that individualism in a way alien even to the spirit of a Max Stirner or a Benjamin Tucker, whose heritage I presume he would claim – to say nothing of how alien is his way to the spirit of Godwin, Proudhon, Bakunin, Kropotkin, Malatesta, and the historically anonymous persons who through their thoughts and action have tried to give anarchism a living meaning. Out of this thread Rothbard manufactures one more bourgeois ideology." Retrieved 7 April 2020.Baker, J. W. "Native American Anarchism". The Raven. 10 (1): 43‒62. Retrieved 7 April 2020. "It is time that anarchists recognise the valuable contributions of individualist anarchist theory and take advantage of its ideas. It would be both futile and criminal to leave it to the capitalist libertarians, whose claims on Tucker and the others can be made only by ignoring the violent opposition they had to capitalist exploitation and monopolistic 'free enterprise' supported by the state." As economic theory changed, the popularity of the labor theory of classical economics was superseded by the subjective theory of value of neoclassical economics and Murray Rothbard, a student of Ludwig von Mises, combined Mises' Austrian School of economics with the absolutist views of human rights and rejection of the state he had absorbed from studying the individualist American anarchists of the 19th century such as Tucker and Spooner. In the mid-1950s, Rothbard was concerned with differentiating himself from communist and socialistic economic views of other anarchists, including the individualist anarchists of the 19th century, arguing that "we are not anarchists [...] but not archists either [...]. Perhaps, then, we could call ourselves by a new name: nonarchist". Joe Peacott, an American individualist in the mutualist tradition, criticizes anarcho-capitalists for trying to hegemonize the individualist anarchism label and make appear as if all individualist anarchists are in favor of capitalism. Peacott states that "individualists, both past and present, agree with the communist anarchists that present-day capitalism is based on economic coercion, not on voluntary contract. Rent and interest are mainstays of modern capitalism, and are protected and enforced by the state. Without these two unjust institutions, capitalism could not exist".

There is a strong current within anarchism including anarchist activists and scholars which rejects that anarcho-capitalism can be considered a part of the anarchist movement because anarchism has historically been an anti-capitalist movement and anarchists see it as incompatible with capitalist forms.Sabatini, Peter (Fall/Winter 1994–1995). "Libertarianism: Bogus Anarchy". Anarchy: A Journal of Desire Armed (41). Retrieved September 4, 2020. "Within [capitalist] Libertarianism, Rothbard represents a minority perspective that actually argues for the total elimination of the state. However Rothbard's claim as an anarchist is quickly voided when it is shown that he only wants an end to the public state. In its place he allows countless private states, with each person supplying their own police force, army, and law, or else purchasing these services from capitalist venders [...] so what remains is shrill anti-statism conjoined to a vacuous freedom in hackneyed defense of capitalism. In sum, the "anarchy" of Libertarianism reduces to a liberal fraud."Goodway, David (2006). Anarchist Seeds Beneath the Snow: Left-Libertarian Thought and British Writers from William Morris to Colin Ward. Liverpool: Liverpool University Press. p. 4. "'Libertarian' and 'libertarianism' are frequently employed by anarchists as synonyms for 'anarchist' and 'anarchism', largely as an attempt to distance themselves from the negative connotations of 'anarchy' and its derivatives. The situation has been vastly complicated in recent decades with the rise of anarcho-capitalism, 'minimal statism' and an extreme right-wing laissez-faire philosophy advocated by such theorists as Rothbard and Nozick and their adoption of the words 'libertarian' and 'libertarianism'. It has therefore now become necessary to distinguish between their right libertarianism and the left libertarianism of the anarchist tradition."McKain, Ian, ed. (2008). "Is 'anarcho'-capitalism a type of anarchism?" An Anarchist FAQ. I Oakland: AK Press. . Although some regard anarcho-capitalism as a form of individualist anarchism,See
 Alan and Trombley, Stephen (Eds.) Bullock, The Norton Dictionary of Modern Thought, W. W. Norton & Co (1999), p. 30.
 Barry, Norman. Modern Political Theory, 2000, Palgrave, p. 70.
 Adams, Ian. Political Ideology Today, Manchester University Press (2002) , p. 135.
 Grant, Moyra. Key Ideas in Politics, Nelson Thomas 2003 , p. 91.
 Heider, Ulrike. Anarchism: Left, Right, and Green, City Lights, 1994. p. 3.
 Avrich, Paul. Anarchist Voices: An Oral History of Anarchism in America, Abridged Paperback Edition (1996), p. 282.
 Tormey, Simon. Anti-Capitalism, One World, 2004. pp. 118–119.
 Raico, Ralph. Authentic German Liberalism of the 19th Century, École Polytechnique, Centre de Recherche en Épistémologie Appliquée, Unité associée au CNRS, 2004.
 Busky, Donald. Democratic Socialism: A Global Survey, Praeger/Greenwood (2000), p. 4.
 Heywood, Andrew. Politics: Second Edition, Palgrave (2002), p. 61.
 Offer, John. Herbert Spencer: Critical Assessments, Routledge (UK) (2000), p. 243. many others disagree with it and contest there is a socialist–individualist divide as individualist anarchism is largely socialistic. Rothbard argued that individualist anarchism is different from anarcho-capitalism and other capitalist theories due to the individualist anarchists retaining the labor theory of value and socialist economics. Similarly, many writers deny that anarcho-capitalism is a form of anarchism and that capitalism is compatible with anarchism.The Palgrave Handbook of Anarchism writes that "[a]s Benjamin Franks rightly points out, individualisms that defend or reinforce hierarchical forms such as the economic-power relations of anarcho-capitalism are incompatible with practices of social anarchism based on developing immanent goods which contest such as inequalities". Laurence Davis cautiosly asks "[I]s anarcho-capitalism really a form of anarchism or instead a wholly different ideological paradigm whose adherents have attempted to expropriate the language of anarchism for their own anti-anarchist ends?" Davis cites Iain McKay, "whom Franks cites as an authority to support his contention that 'academic analysis has followed activist currents in rejecting the view that anarcho-capitalism has anything to do with social anarchism'", as arguing "quite emphatically on the very pages cited by Franks that anarcho-capitalism is by no means a type of anarchism". McKay writes that "[i]t is important to stress that anarchist opposition to the so-called capitalist 'anarchists' does not reflect some kind of debate within anarchism, as many of these types like to pretend, but a debate between anarchism and its old enemy capitalism. [...] Equally, given that anarchists and 'anarcho'-capitalists have fundamentally different analyses and goals it is hardly 'sectarian' to point this out".

Davis writes that "Franks asserts without supporting evidence that most major forms of individualist anarchism have been largely anarcho-capitalist in content, and concludes from this premise that most forms of individualism are incompatible with anarchism". Davis argues that "the conclusion is unsuistainable because the premise is false, depending as it does for any validity it might have on the further assumption that anarcho-capitalism is indeed a form of anarchism. If we reject this view, then we must also reject the individual anarchist versus the communal anarchist 'chasm' style of argument that follows from it". Davis maintains that "the ideological core of anarchism is the belief that society can and should be organised without hierarchy and domination. Historically, anarchists have struggles against a wide range of regimes of domination, from capitalism, the state system, patriarchy, heterosexism, and the domination of nature to colonialism, the war system, slavery, fascism, white supremacy, and certain forms of organised religion". According to Davis, "[w]hile these visions range from the predominantly individualistic to the predominantly communitarian, features common to virtually all include an emphasis on self-management and self-regulatory methods of organisation, voluntary association, decentralised society, based on the principle of free association, in which people will manage and govern themselves". Finally, Davis includes a footnote stating that "[i]ndividualist anarchism may plausibly be re regarded as a form of both socialism and anarchism. Whether the individualist anarchists were consistent anarchists (and socialists) is another question entirely. [...] McKay comments as follows: 'any individualist anarchism which support wage labour is inconsistent anarchism. It can easily be made consistent anarchism by applying its own principles consistently. In contrast 'anarcho'-capitalism rejects so many of the basic, underlying, principles of anarchism [...] that it cannot be made consistent with the ideals of anarchism'".

 References 

 Bibliography 

 Brooks, Frank H. The Individualist Anarchists: An Anthology of Liberty (1881–1908). Transaction Publishers: New Brunswick. 1994.
 Chartier, Gary; Johnson, Charles W. (2011). Markets Not Capitalism: Individualist Anarchism Against Bosses, Inequality, Corporate Power, and Structural Poverty. Brooklyn, NY:Minor Compositions/Autonomedia.
 
 Martin, James J. Men Against the State: the State the Expositors of Individualist Anarchism. The Adrian Allen Associates, Dekalb, Illinois, 1953.
 Parry, Richard. The Bonnot Gang: The Story Of The French Illegalists . Rebel Press, 1987.
 Parvulescu, Constantin. The individualist anarchist discourse of Early Interwat Germany. Cluj University Press, 2018.
 Perraudeau, Michel. Dictionnaire de l'individualisme libertaire. éditions Libertaires. 2011. .
 Rocker, Rudolf. Pioneers of American Freedom: Origin of Liberal and Radical Thought in America. Rocker Publishing Committee. 1949.
 
 Sonn, Richard D. Sex, Violence, and the Avant-Garde: Anarchism in Interwar France. Penn State Press. 2010.
 Steiner, Anne. Les en-dehors: Anarchistes individualistes et illégalistes à la « Belle époque »''. L'Echappée, 2008.
 Various Authors. Enemies of Society: An Anthology of Individualist & Egoist Thought. Ardent Press. 2011.

Further reading 

 William D. P. Bliss, Historical Sketch of Individualist Anarchism (1897) with further references

External links 

 Archives of individualist and egoist texts at the Anarchist Library

 
Anarchist schools of thought
Left-libertarianism
Libertarianism by form
Anarchism
Political theories